Brian Redmond (born 6 March 1977) is best known for his starring role in the judging hotseat on RTÉ One series, Dancing with the Stars. An integral part of the show's team from the very first episode, Brian was hired to be the "Simon Cowell" character of the show.''

Professional dance career
A multi-award-winning dance professional, Redmond has travelled extensively training and teaching, and has performed in some of the world's most prestigious venues including London's Royal Albert Hall and the Kremlin Palace in Moscow. In 2004 he retired from competitive dance and returned to Ireland, basing himself in county Kildare where he lives today with wife Jen and their two children.

Media career
In January 2017, Redmond was named, alongside Loraine Barry and Julian Benson, as a judge on the Irish version of Dancing with the Stars for RTÉ One.

Redmond is a regular on the nation's airwaves and has appeared on the Late Late Show, the Ray D’Arcy Show and the Ryan Tubridy.

In December 2018, Redmond appeared on a one-off charity special of Ireland's Fittest Family alongside his wife, Jen, and two other relatives. They were eliminated in the first round, raising €1,000 for their chosen charity, the LauraLynn Foundation.

Personal life
Brian married Jen Redmond in May 2008. They have two children together.

Brian is an established businessman and is the founder of Spin Activity Centre, a centre for dance, performance and fitness in Newbridge where he also continues to teach dance.

References

External links 
 www.briantredmond.com
 *

Dancing with the Stars (Irish TV series)
Living people
1977 births